The 4th National Hockey League All-Star Game took place at the Detroit Olympia, home of the Detroit Red Wings, on October 8, 1950. The Red Wings defeated a team of NHL all stars, 7–1.

The game
Only 9,166 people attended the game, making it is the smallest attendance figure in All-Star Game history. Ted Lindsay of the Red Wings scored the first hat trick in an All-Star Game, as the Red Wings won 7–1.

Game summary

Referee: George Gravel
Linesmen: George Young, Doug Young

Rosters

Notes

Named to the first All-Star team in 1949–50.
Named to the second All-Star team in 1949–50.

References

 

04th National Hockey League All-Star Game
All
1951
Ice hockey competitions in Detroit
1950 in Detroit
NHL All-Star Game
October 1950 sports events in the United States